Trossin is a municipality in the district Nordsachsen, in Saxony, Germany.

Sons and daughters of the community 

 August von Mackensen (* 1849 in House Leipnitz, † 1945 in Burghorn), Prussian field marshal (Generalfeldmarschall)
 Otto Küstner (* 1849 in Trossin, † 1931 ibid.) Gynecologist, professor at the University of Breslau, honorary member of the Academy of Natural Sciences Leopoldina

References 

Nordsachsen